Alessandro Samuele Kräuchi (born 3 June 1998) is a Swiss professional footballer who plays for St. Gallen in the Swiss Super League.

Club career
Kräuchi made his professional debut with St. Gallen in a 2–0 Swiss Super League loss to BSC Young Boys on 26 September 2018.

International career
Kräuchi was born in Switzerland and is of Italian descent. He is a one-time youth international for the Switzerland U15s and U16s.

References

External links
 
 FCSG Profile
 SFL Profile

1998 births
Living people
Sportspeople from St. Gallen (city)
Association football midfielders
Swiss men's footballers
Switzerland youth international footballers
Swiss people of Italian descent
Swiss Super League players
FC St. Gallen players